A total lunar eclipse will take place on Sunday, December 31, 2028. It will occur during a blue moon and is the first such eclipse to happen on New Year's Eve and New Year's Day since 2009.

Visibility
It will be completely visible over Asia and western Australia, will be seen rising over other areas of Africa and Europe, and setting over eastern Australia and New Zealand.

Related lunar eclipses

Eclipses in 2028
 A partial lunar eclipse on Wednesday, 12 January 2028.
 An annular solar eclipse on Wednesday, 26 January 2028.
 A partial lunar eclipse on Thursday, 6 July 2028.
 A total solar eclipse on Saturday, 22 July 2028.
 A total lunar eclipse on Sunday, 31 December 2028.

Lunar year series

Saros series

This is the 19th of 26 total lunar eclipses in series 125. The previous occurrence was on December 21, 2010 and the next will occur on January 12, 2047.

Half-Saros cycle
A lunar eclipse will be preceded and followed by solar eclipses by 9 years and 5.5 days (a half saros). This lunar eclipse is related to two annular solar eclipses of Solar Saros 132.

Tzolkinex 
 Preceded: Lunar eclipse of November 19, 2021

 Followed: Lunar eclipse of February 11, 2036

See also
List of lunar eclipses and List of 21st-century lunar eclipses

Notes

External links

2028-12
2028-12
2028 in science